Naylor may refer to:

People 
 Bernie Naylor (1923–1993), Australian rules footballer
 Bo Naylor (born 2000), Canadian baseball player
 Brian Naylor (racing driver) (1923–1989), British racing driver
 Brian Naylor (broadcaster) (1931–2009), Australian broadcaster
  Brittany Naylor (born 1993) Social Media Personality
 Charles Naylor (1806–1872), American politician
 Charles Naylor, poet, author, frequent collaborator with Thomas M. Disch
 Christopher Naylor (disambiguation)
 David Naylor (born 1954), Canadian medical researcher
 Dillon Naylor (born 1968), Australian cartoonist
 Dominic Naylor (born 1970), English footballer
 Don Naylor (1910–1991), American radio personality
 Doug Naylor (born 1955), British writer
 Drew Naylor (born 1986), Australian baseball player
 Earl Naylor (1919–1990), American baseball player
 Edward Naylor (1867–1934), English organist and composer
 Emily Gaddum (née Emily Naylor, born 1985), England born New Zealand field hockey player
 Glenn Naylor (born 1972), English footballer
 Gloria Naylor (1950–2016), American novelist
 Grant Naylor, pseudonym for collaborations of Rob Grant and Doug Naylor
 Guillermo Naylor (1884–?), Argentine polo player
 Hattie Naylor, English playwright
 Henry Naylor (born 1966), British comedian
 Jac Naylor, fictional character in the television series Holby City
 Jack Naylor (1919–2007), American inventor
 James Nayler or Naylor (1618–1660),  English Quaker leader
 Jerry Naylor (1939–2019), American singer
 Jimmy Naylor (1901–1983), English footballer
 Joan Naylor, mother of Richard Boyle, 1st Earl of Cork
 John Naylor (disambiguation)
 Josh Naylor (born 1997), Canadian baseball player
 Kenneth Naylor (1937–1992), American linguist and Slavist
 Lee Naylor (disambiguation)
 Mark Naylor (born 1957), English high jumper
 Martyn Naylor (born 1977), English footballer
 Matt Naylor (born 1983), Australian field hockey player
 Mya-Lecia Naylor (2002–2019), English actress and singer
 Nick Naylor, fictional character in some of Christopher Buckley's novels
 Phyllis Reynolds Naylor (born 1933), American author
 Reg Naylor (1897–1945), Australian rules footballer
 R. H. Naylor (1889–1952), British astrologer
 Richard Naylor (born 1977), English footballer
 Rikki Naylor, True Blood character
 Robert Naylor (disambiguation)
 Rollie Naylor (1892–1966), American baseball player
 Scott Naylor (born 1972), English rugby league player and coach
 Sean Naylor, Canadian journalist
 Stuart Naylor (born 1962), English footballer
 Terry Naylor (born 1948), English footballer
 Thomas Naylor (1936–2012), American economist
 Thomas Naylor (politician) (1868–1958), British politician
 Tom Naylor (born 1991), English footballer
 Tony Naylor (born 1967), English footballer
 William Naylor, television producer
 Zoe Naylor (born 1977), Australian actress

Places
Naylor, New Zealand, theoretically in Hamilton
Naylor, Georgia, U.S.
Naylor, Missouri, U.S.
Naylor Road (Washington Metro), a transit station in Prince George's County, Maryland, U.S.

Other
 Naylor Observatory, near Lewisberry, Pennsylvania, U.S.
Naylor TF 1700, a car by defunct British manufacturer Naylor Cars
 

English-language surnames
Occupational surnames